Ebenezer Benyarko Hagan (born 1 October 1975 in Kumasi) is a former Ghanaian International footballer who last played for Sekondi Hasaacas F.C. in the Ghana Premier League.

Career 
He played eight years in Greece for Kalamata F.C., Iraklis Saloniki and PAOK F.C. and played 235 games and scored 31 goals. After 8 years in Greece he moved to Cyprus-based club APOEL in Nicosia, where he played for six months, appearing in 10 games and scoring 1 goal. On 1 September 2006 he moved to Sekondi Hasaacas F.C. (Ghana) and ended his career in 2007.

International 
He was a member of the Ghana national football team at the 1996 Summer Olympics in Atlanta and played 4 games and scored 1 goal.

References

External links
 
 

1975 births
Living people
Ghanaian footballers
Association football midfielders
Ghanaian expatriate footballers
Expatriate footballers in Greece
Expatriate footballers in Cyprus
Ghana international footballers
Olympic footballers of Ghana
Footballers at the 1996 Summer Olympics
Super League Greece players
Cypriot First Division players
APOEL FC players
PAOK FC players
Iraklis Thessaloniki F.C. players
Kalamata F.C. players
Ashanti Gold SC players
Ghanaian expatriate sportspeople in Cyprus
Footballers from Kumasi